Gijs Scholten van Aschat (born 16 September 1959) is a Dutch actor. He has appeared in more than sixty films since 1980.

He is the father of Reinout Scholten van Aschat.

Selected filmography

References

External links
 
Gijs Scholten van Aschat at Toneelgroep Amsterdam

1959 births
Living people
Dutch male film actors
Dutch male television actors
People from Doorn